David Claypoole Johnston (25 March 1799 – 8 November 1865) was a 19th-century American cartoonist, printmaker, painter, and actor from Boston, Massachusetts. He was the first natively trained American to master all the various graphic arts processes of lithography, etching, metal plate engraving, and wood engraving.

Johnston was born in Philadelphia, the son of William Johnston and Charlotte Rowson, an actress who was sister-in-law of author actress and educator Susanna Rowson. In 1815, Johnston had studied engraving as an apprentice of Philadelphia engraver Francis Kearney, and he himself became an engraver of original caricatures, which were too controversial for publishing. In 1821, he switched to a theatrical career, appearing for the first time at the Walnut Street Theatre on 10 March 1821, as Henry in Speed the Plough. He performed for five seasons with theatre companies in Philadelphia and Boston.

Afterward, he retired from the stage and set up an engraver's office in Boston. His most important early work was a series of etched and lithographed character portraits of well-known American and British actors. In the years between 1829 and 1849, he published nine numbers of his annual comic Scraps, made of four plates, each containing nine or ten separate humorous sketches.

Image gallery

References

Further reading

Works by Johnston
 Scraps (nine editions, 1829-1849). 
 American comic annual. v.1 (1831). Illustrated by Johnston.
 Timothy Titterwell. Yankee Notions: a Medley, 4th ed. 1847. Illustrated by Johnston.

Works about Johnston
 Malcolm Johnson. David Claypool Johnston: American Graphic Humorist, 1798-1865. Lunenburg, Vermont: Stinehour Press, 1970.
 David Tatham. David Claypoole Johnston's "Militia Muster." American Art Journal, Vol. 19, No. 2 (Spring, 1987), pp. 4–15.
 Jennifer A. Greenhill. Playing the Fool: "David Claypoole Johnston and the Menial Labor of Caricature". American Art, Vol. 17, No. 3 (Autumn, 2003), pp. 33–51.

External links

 WorldCat. Johnston, David Claypoole 1799–1865
 American Antiquarian Society. David Claypoole Johnston online exhibit, 2003.
 American Antiquarian Society. Flickr. Johnston images.
 Syracuse University Library. "David Claypool Johnston (1798-1865)" page in "Draw your own conclusions" exhibit.
 American Antiquarian Society. Portrait of Thomas Murphy Johnston by Johnston

American cartoonists
American printmakers
19th-century American painters
19th-century American actors
American wood engravers
1799 births
1865 deaths
19th century in Boston
19th-century American people
Artists from Boston